Jannik Sinner (born 16 August 2001) is an Italian professional tennis player. He has been ranked as high as world No. 9 by the Association of Tennis Professionals (ATP), achieved on 1 November 2021, and world No. 124 in doubles, achieved on 27 September 2021. Sinner has won seven ATP titles in singles and one in doubles, and became the youngest ATP title-holder since 2008 by winning the 2020 Sofia Open and the youngest to have five titles since Novak Djokovic in 2007. He became the first teenage ATP 500 champion since the category was renamed in 2009 by winning the 2021 Citi Open.

Sinner grew up in northern Italy in the region of South Tyrol. He was active in skiing, football, and tennis as a child. After winning a national championship in skiing at age eight, Sinner switched his focus to tennis at age thirteen and moved to the Italian Riviera to train with veteran coach Riccardo Piatti. Despite limited success as a junior, Sinner began playing in professional events at age 16 and became one of the few players to win multiple ATP Challenger Tour titles at age 17. He won the ATP Newcomer of the Year award in 2019 after breaking through into the top 100, reaching his first ATP semifinal, and winning the Next Generation ATP Finals in Milan. 

Sinner continued his rise into the top 50 in 2020 with his first top 10 victories, a French Open quarterfinal (becoming the youngest quarterfinalist in men's singles since Novak Djokovic in 2006), and a maiden ATP title. He had a strong start to 2021, highlighted by his second ATP title in a row and a Masters 1000 runner-up at the Miami Open. On 1 November 2021, he became the first player born in the 2000s to enter the ATP top 10.

Sinner has an excellent two-handed backhand and has led the ATP Tour in the amount of topspin on the shot.

Early life and background
Jannik Sinner was born 16 August 2001 to Johann and Siglinde Sinner in San Candido in the region of South Tyrol in northern Italy. He grew up in the town of Sexten, where his father and mother work as a chef and a waitress at a ski lodge. He has a brother named Marc. Sinner began both skiing and playing tennis at age three. He was one of Italy's top junior skiers from eight to twelve years old, winning a national championship in giant slalom at age eight and earning a national runner-up at the age of twelve. 

While training in skiing, Sinner gave up tennis for a year at the age of seven before his father pushed him to return to the sport. When he resumed playing, he began working with Heribert Mayr as his first regular coach. Nonetheless, tennis was still only his third priority behind skiing and football.

At the age of thirteen, Sinner decided to give up skiing and football in favour of tennis. He preferred it over skiing because he wanted to compete directly against an opponent and to have more margin of error over the course of an entire match. He also wanted to be in an individual sport where he could make all of the decisions, an opportunity he would not have in a team sport like football. He decided to move on his own to Bordighera on the Italian Riviera to train at the Piatti Tennis Centre under Riccardo Piatti and Massimo Sartori, a decision which his parents supported. At the centre, Sinner lived with the family of Luka Cvjetković, one of his coaches. Before Sinner began training in tennis full-time with Piatti, he had been playing only twice a week.

Junior career
Sinner began playing on the ITF Junior Circuit, the premier junior tour which is run by the International Tennis Federation (ITF), in 2016. Despite having limited success as a junior, he moved mainly to the professional tour following the end of 2017. He never played the main draw of any high-level Grade 1 events in singles, and the only higher-level Grade A tournament he entered was the Trofeo Bonfiglio. He followed up an opening round loss at Italy's Grade A tournament in 2017 with a quarterfinal in 2018. That was the only junior event he played in 2018. He never played any of the junior Grand Slam tournaments. Because he entered so few high-level tournaments, Sinner's career-high junior ranking was a relatively low No. 133.

Professional career

2018: ITF Futures and Challenger Tour
Sinner wasn't too focused on the junior circuit, and he began playing on the ITF Men's Circuit in early 2018. With his low ranking, he could initially be directly accepted into only ITF Futures events. Nonetheless, he began receiving wild cards for ATP Challenger Tour events, the second tier tour run by the Association of Tennis Professionals (ATP), in the second half of the year. His only ITF title of the year was in doubles, and he finished the season ranked No. 551.

2019: ATP Next Gen title and top 100

Sinner won his first ATP Challenger title in Bergamo in February 2019 at the age of 17 years and 6 months, despite entering the tournament with no match wins at the Challenger level. He became the first person born in 2001 to reach a Challenger final, and the youngest Italian to win a Challenger title in history. With the title, he rose over 200 spots in ATP rankings up to No. 324. After his first two ITF Futures titles, Sinner entered his first ATP tournament at the Hungarian Open as a lucky loser, where he notched his first tour-level win over home wild card Máté Valkusz. The next week, he reached his second ATP Challenger final in Ostrava, finishing runner-up to Kamil Majchrzak.

During the second half of the season, Sinner played more often on the ATP Tour than the Challenger Tour. His first ATP Masters victory came at the Italian Open against Steve Johnson, and he broke into the top 200 with his next ATP win at the Croatia Open Umag in July. The next month, he won a second ATP Challenger title in Lexington to become one of just eleven 17-year-olds to have won multiple Challenger titles. After losing in qualifying at Wimbledon, Sinner qualified for his first Grand Slam main draw at the US Open. He lost his debut match to No. 24 Stan Wawrinka.

Sinner had a strong finish to the season. As a wild card at the European Open, he became the youngest player in five years to reach an ATP semifinal. Along the way, he knocked off top seed and world No. 13 Gael Monfils for his first career top 50 victory. This performance helped him break into the top 100 for the first time one week later. At the end of the season, Sinner qualified for the 2019 Next Gen ATP Finals as the Italian wild card and the lowest seed. He won in his round robin group with victories over Frances Tiafoe and Mikael Ymer, losing only to Ugo Humbert. After defeating Miomir Kecmanović in the semifinals, Sinner upset top seed and world No. 18 Alex de Minaur in straight sets to win the title. He played one last event in Italy the following week, winning a third Challenger title in Ortisei. Sinner finished the year at world No. 78, becoming the youngest player in the year-end top 80 since Rafael Nadal in 2003. He was also named ATP Newcomer of the Year.

2020: First ATP title and top 40
Early in the year, Sinner made the second round of the 2020 Australian Open, recording his first Grand Slam main draw match win over home wild card Max Purcell before losing to Márton Fucsovics. As a wild card at the Rotterdam Open, he earned his first top 10 victory against world No. 10 David Goffin.

Following the ATP Tour shutdown due to the COVID-19 pandemic, Sinner had a successful restart to the season. Although he lost his opening round match to Karen Khachanov at the US Open, he fared better in Europe. He reached the third round at the Rome Masters, highlighted by a victory over world No. 6 Stefanos Tsitsipas. He then progressed to become the youngest quarterfinalist at the French Open since Novak Djokovic in 2006, and the first to make the quarterfinals on debut since Rafael Nadal in 2005. During the tournament, he defeated Goffin again as well as US Open runner-up and world No. 7 Alexander Zverev before losing to Nadal. After a semifinal at the Cologne Championship where he lost to Zverev, 

Sinner closed out the season by winning the Sofia Open for his first ATP title. During the event, he defeated Next Gen rival Alex de Minaur and then Vasek Pospisil in the final. He became the youngest Italian tour-level champion in the Open Era and the youngest player overall to win an ATP title since Kei Nishikori in 2008.

Sinner finished the year ranked world No. 37.

2021: Masters final, ATP 500 and three more titles, top 10 debut
Sinner carried over his success from late 2020 into the start of the 2021 season. He won his second career ATP title at the Great Ocean Road Open, and notably defeated No. 20 Karen Khachanov in the semifinals after saving a match point. He became the youngest to win back-to-back ATP titles since Rafael Nadal in 2005. His ten-match winning streak came to an end in the first round of the 2021 Australian Open, where he lost a tight five-set match to world No. 12 Denis Shapovalov. 

Sinner's next big result was at the Miami Open, where he reached his first ATP Masters 1000 final. During the tournament, he defeated Khachanov again and later world No. 12 Roberto Bautista Agut in the semifinal. He finished runner-up to Hubert Hurkacz.

Then at the French Open, his campaign was stopped short for the second year running by Rafael Nadal who this time defeated Sinner in straight sets in the fourth round. In his main draw debut at Wimbledon, he lost in the first round to Márton Fucsovics.

Partnering Reilly Opelka he won his first doubles title at the 2021 Atlanta Open, defeating Steve Johnson and Jordan Thompson. At the same tournament in singles he fell in the second round to Christopher O'Connell.

At the 2021 Citi Open in Washington, D.C., Sinner went into the tournament as the fifth seed and made it to the finals and beat several young players along the way such as Emil Ruusuvuori, Sebastian Korda, and Jenson Brooksby. He beat Mackenzie McDonald in the final to win his third title and first ATP 500 title. Sinner was the first Italian finalist and champion in Washington's tournament history as well as the youngest ATP 500 and first teen champion since the category was created in 2009. As a result he entered the top 15 in the ATP rankings on 9 August 2021.

At the US Open, he defeated Gaël Monfils in the third round to reach the second week of a Major for the second time in the season. Sinner's tournament ended when he lost to Alexander Zverev in the 4th round in straight sets.

Sinner successfully defended his title at the Sofia Open as the top seed, defeating again second seed Gaël Monfils in the final.
Sinner made his sixth career final at the 2021 European Open without dropping a set en route. He defeated Lorenzo Musetti, Arthur Rinderknech and Lloyd Harris to reach the final. He bested Diego Schwartzman in the final to take his fifth career title. He became the youngest man to win five ATP titles since 19-year-old Novak Djokovic.

On November 1, Sinner became the first male player born in the 2000's to break into the top-10 after a semifinal appearance at the Vienna Open.
At the Rolex Paris Masters, Sinner received a bye in the first round but was defeated by Carlos Alcaraz. Because of this, Sinner was unable to directly qualify for the season-ending Nitto ATP Finals. 

At the ATP Finals in Turin, Sinner was present as the first alternate. Sinner entered the tournament after countryman Matteo Berrettini was forced to withdraw with an abdominal injury after his first match with Alexander Zverev. He defeated Hubert Hurkacz and became the youngest player to win an ATP Finals match on debut since Lleyton Hewitt in Lisbon in 2000 and the first alternate to win a match since Janko Tipsarević in London in 2011. Sinner played Daniil Medvedev next in the round robin stage, holding a match point before being defeated in 3 sets. As a result he reentered the top-10 in the rankings and finished the year at world No. 10 on 22 November 2021.

In the Davis Cup Finals, Sinner defeated John Isner becoming only the second player (after Thiemo de Bakker) ever to bagel Isner.

2022: Three major quarterfinals, Davis Cup success 
At the Australian Open, Sinner reached the quarterfinals of a major for the second time in his career, becoming the fifth Italian man to reach that stage in Melbourne. He then lost to fourth seed Stefanos Tsitsipas in straight sets.

At the Miami Open, he saved three match points in the opening round against Emil Ruusuvuori and five match points against Pablo Carreno Busta to advance to the round of 16. He then defeated Nick Kyrgios but retired against Francisco Cerundolo in the quarterfinals. In the Monte Carlo Masters, he again reached the quarterfinals after defeating fifth seed Andrey Rublev, before losing to second seed Alexander Zverev in a three-set and over three hour-long match. He again saved three match points in the opener at the Madrid Open against Tommy Paul to move to the second round. Next, he defeated Alex de Minaur for his 100th career win; he hit this milestone after 147 matches (100–47) on Tour, which was a faster rate than everyone in the Top 10 besides Rafael Nadal (100–37) and Novak Djokovic (100–43). He was defeated in the third round by Felix Auger Aliassime.

At the French Open, he retired in the fourth round against Andrey Rublev after sustaining a knee injury.

At the Eastbourne International, Sinner suffered his first opening round loss of the year after losing to Tommy Paul in three sets. At the 2022 Wimbledon Championships, he recorded his first win at this Major over Stan Wawrinka. He then beat Mikael Ymer, John Isner, and Carlos Alcaraz to reach his third career Grand Slam quarterfinal. He lost to top seed and eventual champion Novak Djokovic in five sets in the quarterfinals, after being two sets to love up.

At the Croatia Open, Sinner defeated Carlos Alcaraz in the final to win his first clay court title. In Montreal, he lost to eventual champion Pablo Carreno Busta in the third round. Sinner's loss guaranteed a maiden Masters 1000 finalist from his half of the draw. At the Cincinnati Masters, he lost in the third round to Felix Auger Aliassime after being up a set, a break, and 2 match points.

Seeded 11th at the US Open, he reached the fourth round after defeating Brandon Nakashima in four sets. Next, he defeated Ilya Ivashka in a five set match lasting close to four hours to reach the quarterfinals for the first time at this Major. He became the youngest player to reach the quarterfinals of all four Grand Slam tournaments since Novak Djokovic in 2007–08. He lost to Carlos Alcaraz in a five-set match that lasted 5 hours and 15 minutes; the match set the record as the latest finish (at 2:50AM EST) and second longest match in US Open history. Sinner held a match point while serving up 5–4 in the 4th set, but ended up losing the set 5–7. In September, during the Davis Cup Finals after Matteo Berrettini won his singles match against Argentina, Sinner won the second match (best of three matches) and thus secured a place for Italy's Davis Cup team at the Final 8 of the Davis Cup Finals. Following close to a month break due to an injury sustained in the semifinal at the 2022 Sofia Open he returned to the 2022 Erste Bank Open in Vienna and reached also the quarterfinals losing to top seed and eventual champion Daniil Medvedev. In his next tournament, the 2022 Rolex Paris Masters, he lost in the first round to qualifier Marc-Andrea Huesler.

2023: ATP title, Italian No. 1
Sinner won the 2023 Open Sud de France in Montpellier, becoming the first player to win a tour-level title in the season without having dropped a single set and the first since countryman Lorenzo Musetti won the title in Naples in October 2022.

At the 2023 ABN AMRO Open he defeated top seed and world No. 3 Stefanos Tsitsipas taking his revenge for the 2023 Australian Open  fourth round five setter loss, for his biggest win ever. Next in the quarterfinals, he defeated Stan Wawrinka. In the semifinals, he defeated home favorite Tallon Griekspoor to reach the final.

Playing style
Sinner has been compared to Roger Federer for his calm on-court demeanor and all-court movement. Federer himself has praised Sinner for the balance in his game, remarking, "What I like about him is that he almost has the same speed of shooting from the forehand and backhand." Former world No. 1 junior and tennis coach Claudio Pistolesi has praised Sinner's good lateral movement, which he attributes in part to Sinner's background in skiing. In this regard, Sinner has been compared to Novak Djokovic, who also credits a background in skiing for improving his tennis skills.

Coaches
When Sinner began to prioritize tennis at age thirteen, he was coached by Riccardo Piatti, who had also been a part-time coach of Novak Djokovic and Milos Raonic. At the time, he also began working with Andrea Volpini and Massimo Sartori, the latter of whom was a longtime coach of Andreas Seppi. He continued to work with Piatti as his primary coach, and Volpini as his second coach. His team also consisted of physiotherapist Claudio Zimaglia and fitness coach Dalibor Sirola. In February of 2022, he decided to stop his long collaboration with Piatti and his team and began to train with Simone Vagnozzi, ex-coach of Marco Cecchinato. In July 2022, coach Darren Cahill officially joined Sinner's team.

Personal life
Sinner resides in Monte Carlo in Monaco. He is a fan of A.C. Milan football club. One of his tennis idols is compatriot Andreas Seppi, who is also from Alto Adige. Nonetheless, he aspires to surpass Seppi in terms of achievements. For that reason, his main idols are Roger Federer and Novak Djokovic.

Sinner is trilingual; fluent in three languages (Italian, German and  English).

Career statistics

Grand Slam singles performance timeline

Source: ATP profile

Masters 1000 finals

Singles: 1 (1 runner-up)

See also
Jannik Sinner career statistics
Italian players best ranking
Tennis in Italy

References

External links

 
 

2001 births
Living people
Italian male tennis players
People from Innichen
People from Monte Carlo
Germanophone Italian people
Expatriate sportspeople in Monaco
Sportspeople from Südtirol